A bandolier bag is a Native American shoulder pouch, often beaded. Early examples were made from pelts, twined fabrics, or hide, but beginning in the fur trade era, Native American women across sewed these bags with imported wool broadcloth, lined with cotton calico, and often edged with silk ribbons.

Name 
The bags are named for bandoliers or the cloths carrying gunpowder that soldiers wore from the 16th to early 20th centuries. They are also called shot pouches or simply shoulder bags. 

In Ojibwemowin, or the Ojibwe language, bandolier bags are called gashkibidaagan. The Ojibwe name comes from the word parts, gashk-, meaning "enclosed, attached together" and -bid, "tie it."

The English word bandolier comes from the French word bandouliere meaning "shoulder belt" and traces back to the Spanish bandoera the diminutive of banda or "sash."

Use 
A bandolier bag may be worn either across the shoulder to the side or in front like an apron. Men wore them and placed valuables such as tobacco, pipes, medicine, or flint for starting fires.

Gallery

References

External links
Bandolier Bag Collection, Milwaukee Public Museum

Bags
Native American religion
Indigenous culture of the Great Plains
Indigenous culture of the Northeastern Woodlands
Indigenous culture of the Southeastern Woodlands
Indigenous culture of the Subarctic